Magzter is a cross-platform, self-service, global digital newsstand with thousands of magazines and newspapers from 5,000+ publishers. Girish Ramdas and Vijayakumar Radhakrishnan founded Magzter in 2011. The company is headquartered in New York.

History
Girish Ramdas, the company's CEO, and Vijayakumar Radhakrishnan, the company's President, founded Magzter in 2011.  In 2010, Radhakrishnan began the development of a platform to digitally publish magazines and provide access to consumers to the magazine store's app launch in mid-2011. In 2012, Magzter completed its Series A funding round. In September 2012, Magzter was listed The Highest Grossing App in Asia on the Apple Store.

In July 2013, the firm entered into a collaboration with Amazon's Kindle Fire and introduced books to their publishing platform in September 2013. The company also completed its Series B funding round that year, which   raised $10 million. In early 2015, Magzter launched Magzter GOLD, an all-you-can-read subscription model, similar to Netflix or Spotify, that currently provides unlimited access to over 8,000 magazines and newspapers from around the globe. The company also has Magzter GOLD Lite, that allows unlimited access to five titles.

Business operations
Magzter distributes magazines and newspapers from several countries including the United States, the United Kingdom, Europe, China, Hong Kong, Canada, Australia, Sri Lanka, South Africa, Indonesia, India, Thailand, the Philippines, Malaysia, and Singapore. The company works with more than 5,000 publishers in more than 60 languages.

In July 2022, the company had 80 employees. The Magzter app, which has amassed over 85 million downloads, is available on Apple iOS, Android (Google Play) and Amazon Appstore. The company counts among its publisher customers some marquee names including Dotdash Meredith (USA), Condé Nast (USA), Hearst (USA), A360 Media (USA), Bloomberg (USA), Maxim Inc. (USA), Guardian News & Media (UK), Dennis Publishing (UK), Future (UK), Reach Publishing Services Limited (UK), Media24 (South Africa), Tatler Asia (Singapore), India Today Group (India), Worldwide Media (India), HT Digital Streams Limited (India), SPH Media Limited (Singapore), Are Media (Australia) and Grupo Expansión (Mexico). Magzter has been rapidly increasing its publisher base with magazines and newspapers from over 50 countries, making it truly the #1 choice for readers and publishers globally.  Its headquarters are located in New York and sales offices and teams are in London, Mexico City, Amsterdam, Mumbai, New Delhi, Chennai, Bengaluru and Singapore.

Business model
Magzter participates in a revenue share model with publishers on magazine and newspaper sales.  The company also provides publishers with real-time sales reports. Magzter also uses an automated cloud service to upload magazines and newspapers.

References

External links
 
 Magzter Gold - "All-You-Can-Read" Subscription Model
 Magzter - Apple App Store
 Magzter - Google Play (Android App)
 Magzter - Consumer Complaints

Companies established in 2011
Online publishing companies of the United States
Zines
Online magazines published in the United States
Ebooks
Magazine publishing companies of the United States
American digital libraries
Magazines established in 2011